Jamboree Lake is a small recreational lake in Muntinlupa, Metro Manila, the Philippines. At , it is the smallest natural lake in the country located within the  New Bilibid Prison Reservation. It is one of two lakes located entirely within the borders of Metro Manila, the other being the artificial La Mesa Dam and Reservoir in Quezon City.

Description

It is in the eastern portion of the New Bilibid Prison Reservation, close to NBP Gate 1 at its boundary with Camella Homes Alabang IV-A and the Tensuan villages of Poblacion along the South Luzon Expressway. The lake lies just to north of the Magdaong River which flows down to the southern boundary of the reservation into Muntinlupa's border with Bacoor. It has no visible inlets or outlets. Its water level depends mainly on ground water level or precipitation amount.

Jamboree Lake is in a hilly area and is surrounded by trees and greenery, with a depressed garden, known simply as Sunken Garden, located immediately to the southwest. Near its southern edge is the Memorial Hill that features an old Imperial Japanese cannon used during World War II, as well as a grotto of Our Lady of Lourdes and the grave of Major Eriberto Misa, the longest-serving director of New Bilibid Prison. The lake and its gardens are bounded by General Paulino Santos Avenue and Insular Prison Road.

The lake contains populations of tilapia and silver perch.

History
Very little is known about the lake's origins, other than the presence of a small replica of the Statue of Liberty that once stood in the middle of the lake in the 1940s. With the transfer of inmates from the Old Bilibid Prison (Bilibid Viejo or Cárcel y Presidio Correccional) in Santa Cruz, Manila to this new facility in 1941, the lands surrounding the lake served as the prison's food production area. Early inmates from the Cordillera Administrative Region helped develop the area by building terraces along the lake's shoreline reminiscent of the rice terraces in their native Ifugao.

The lake also figured during World War II and was also near where the first regular Masses were held in the 1950s before a permanent chapel to Our Lady of Mercy was built to serve prison employees and inmates. In 1955, the Statue of Liberty replica was replaced by that of Lady Justice, designed by former Bureau of Corrections officer Moses Saunar.

The lake was declared a "cultural and historical wealth" by the local government and was placed under the jurisdiction and management of the Muntinlupa Cultural Affairs Office and Tourism Council in 1999.

References

Landforms of Metro Manila
Lakes of the Philippines
Muntinlupa